Peak to Peak Charter School is a K-12 public charter school offering a liberal arts, college-preparatory curriculum. Peak to Peak is located in the Boulder Valley School District (BVSD) in Lafayette, Colorado, United States.

Academics 
U.S. News & World Report Best High Schools ranked Peak to Peak 210th nationally and 6th in Colorado in 2022.

Accreditation 

Peak to Peak is accredited through the Colorado Department of Education (2003-present). It also received a College Preparatory Accreditation from the North Central Association (2004-2012) and subsequently from its successor AdvancED (2012-2020). It was also listed as a John Irwin School of Excellence (2003-2013).

Students, community, and staff members 

Peak to Peak encourages all students to pursue their individual interests both through programs offered by the school and opportunities in the real world. Students and staff members are celebrated for individual and group accomplishments on a diverse range of topics.

Stamping controversy 

Cafeteria staff had been in the practice of stamping the hands of students to indicate their lunch accounts were low or empty. The school stated that a change in payment program software did not allow cafeteria staff members to identify students who qualified for the free and reduced lunch program, he wrote, and some of those students mistakenly had their hands stamped. Upon discovery of the practice, Principal Noelle Roni ordered the cafeteria staff to discontinue stamping students' hands.  The school board dismissed Roni in January 2014. Roni has said that she believes she was fired because of her opposition to the policy, which she has described as disrespectful towards students. In response, the school stated that “This was a grievous mistake, and when it came to light, the food services staff and the software company worked quickly to resolve the issue, The school immediately stopped the past practice of hand stamping, and the software issue was fixed.

References

External links 
Peak to Peak Charter School

Public elementary schools in Colorado
Public high schools in Colorado
Public middle schools in Colorado
Charter schools in Colorado
Schools in Boulder County, Colorado
Educational institutions established in 1999
Lafayette, Colorado
1999 establishments in Colorado